Nkosinathi Innocent Maphumulo (born 11 March 1976), better known by his stage name Black Coffee, is a South African  DJ, record producer and songwriter. Coffee established his own record label Soulistic Music, and released his debut self-titled album Black Coffee (2005), which incorporated  elements of R&B and jazz.

His career began around 1994 and became prominent after participating in the 2004 Red Bull Music Academy, since then he has released nine studio albums, as well as a live DVD.

Throughout his musical career his accolades include:  8 SAMA, 4 DJ Awards,  2 Metro FM Awards and 1 Grammy award.

Life and  career 
Nkosinathi Innocent Maphumulo was born on 11 March 1976 in Umlazi, South Africa. He later moved to Umtata, the town 29 km away from the home of Nelson Mandela Qunu village, staying at the Ngangelizwe township.
On the 11th of February 1990, whilst celebrating the release of Nelson Mandela, he was involved in a taxi accident that left him with a brachial plexus injury resulting in him losing the use of his left arm.

He majored in Jazz Studies at Technikon Natal, now known as the Durban University of Technology, before working as a backup singer for Madala Kunene together with then schoolmates: Mnqobi Mdabe (Shota) and Thandukwazi Sikhosana (Demor). Maphumulo, Shota and Demor later formed an Afro-pop trio called SHANA (Simply Hot and Naturally African) which was signed to Melt 2000, then headed by Robert Trunz.

He was chosen as one of two South African participants in the Red Bull Music Academy in 2003, jump-starting him into the South African dance music scene. His first big break was when his song 'Happiness' was featured on the 'DJs at Work' album.

2005–2006: Black Coffee 
In 2005, Maphumulo launched his career with a remix of Hugh Masekela's 1972 hit Stimela. Later that year he released his self-titled debut album, and created his record company Soulistic Music. The album sampled songs of notable South African artists like Thandiswa Mazwai, Hugh Masekela and featured Busi Mhlongo, among others. He was well received in the country and was quickly lauded as a "rising star." His album, 'Black Coffee', was created using very basic music-making software. Maphumulo himself stated,

2007–2008: Have Another One 

By Mid-2007, Black Coffee had become recognized in the South African DJ scene with tribal, vocal-laced beats. In the same year he released his second studio album titled Have Another One, which featured "Wathula Nje," a remix of Victor Ntoni's 2004 jazz ballad "Thetha". "Wathula Nje" was later released in Europe together with "Even Though" featuring Bantu Soul through the European label Realtone Records on vinyl and on digital. The twelve-track album featured the likes of Siphokazi, Busi Mhlongo, and Kwaito sensation L'vovo. It also debuted a then 17-year-old high school producer from Eshowe Kwa Zulu Natal, Culoe De Song, who became the second artist to be signed under Soulistic Music. Maphumulo discovered and collaborated with Culoe De Song on an afro-electronic dub titled 100 Zulu warriors.

During this period Black Coffee performed at the Red Bull Music Academy Lounge at the Sonar Festival in Barcelona, alongside recognized DJs such as Little Louie Vega, Alix Alvarez, Frank Roger, Charles Webster, DJ Spinna and Osunlade.

2009–2011: Home Brewed 
In 2009, Maphumulo released his third album, Home Brewed, featuring Ringo Madlingozi, Zonke, Hugh Masekela, Zakes Bantwini and others.

Between 2009 and 2010, new releases from Culoe de Song, Tumelo and Zakes Bantwini achieved gold and platinum sales.

In 2010, he tried to make it to Guinness Book of World Records when he performed for 60 hours non-stop at Maponya Mall, Soweto. He also won two awards in the categories of Best Urban Dance Album and Best Male Artist at the 2010 South African Music Awards.

In 2011, Africa Rising was launched at Moses Mabhida Stadium in Durban. It included a live band and 24-piece orchestra in front of an audience of about 8,000 people and was filmed for the Africa Rising DVD. That year saw four other releases including Culoe de Song's "Elevation", Sai & Ribatones "Here and Now," Boddhi Satva's "Invocation" and the label's "Soulistic Music Cuts."

2012–2013: Africa Rising 
In 2012, the "Africa Rising" DVD and triple-CD sold double platinum in a space of a month. Maphumulo featured different artists on the album, such as Bucie and soulful musician Toshi Tikolo on the song "Buya."

In 2013, he performed internationally at locations such as Southport Weekender, Panoroma Bar, Circoloco, Boiler Room. He also participated in music conferences like ADE and RBMA in Johannesburg. That same year, he was involved in notable collaborations with musical group Mi Casa and house duo Black Motion. He also became one of the key speakers on his friend Vusi Thembekwayo's tour. In South Africa, he was featured in November 2013 in the Destiny Man edition of Destiny.

2015–2019: Pieces of Me, Music Is King 
He began his first world tour in January 2015 at Circoloco, Mexico and it ended in August 2015 at Circoloco at DC-10. That same year, he released his fifth album, Pieces of Me.

Pieces of Me was released in the second week of September and which was certified platinum a month after release  by the Recording Industry of South Africa (RISA). It received criticism for its cover and title bearing a similarity to that of the 2011 album Pieces of Me by US singer Ledisi. Musically, the album was widely positively received, with some music critics saying that it was among the best music albums of the year. It went platinum in South Africa in October. On this album, he collaborated with Azola, Portia Monique, Ribatone, Nakhane Toure, Mondli Ngcobo, Kensy, NaakMusiq & Lungi Naidoo.

In 2016, he performed at Coachella Valley Music and Arts Festival and Ultra Music Festival. At the end of the year, he was ranked 91st on Resident Advisor's top 100 DJs list.

In 2017, he contributed to the beat of the song "Get It Together" on Drake's album More Life, which was released in March 2017.

In 2018, he released a single where he collaborated with David Guetta that was titled "Drive" featuring Delilah Montagu. It was featured on Guetta's album 7. At the end of that year, he released a seven-track EP titled Music Is King. The EP features Msaki, Samthing Soweto, Mondli Ngcobo, Karyendasoul, and Zhao. Music Is King was nominated for Best Dance Album, Album of the Year and won Best Male Artist of the Year at 25th South African Music Awards.  In December 2019, he embarked on Music Is King Concert  to promote his EP, performed at Ticketpro Dome, Johannesburg  on 14 and Kings Park Outer Field, Durban on 15.

In 2018, he also performed at Salle Wagram which is Paris' oldest ballroom. The set was produced by Cercle and feature his signature melodic sounds of Africa.

In September 2019, he released "LaLaLa" with American R&B singer Usher.

2020–present: Subconsciously 
On 5 February 2021, Black Coffee released his seventh studio album, Subconsciously. The album won the award for Best Dance/Electronic Album at the 64th Annual Grammy Awards.

In October 2021, he produced a remake of the single "Too Late for Mama" by Mpho Sebina, which was released on the extended play Music Forever.

Coffee co-wrote and co-produced three songs on Drake's 2022 album Honestly, Nevermind.

Personal life 
Maphumulo married actress and television presenter Enhle Mbali Mlotshwa in 2011. They have two children together and he has two more from a previous relationship.

In 2014, the couple made news when Sunday World, a South African tabloid, reported that Maphumulo had allegedly cheated on Mlotshwa with a local model and that a woman from the Free State region was behind the allegations, and was demanding R100 000 from Maphumulo after coming into possession of a sex tape which verified her claims. In August 2018, the DJ admitted to the affair, which he explained was the result of "being young and being overwhelmed by fame".

The couple was involved in another cheating scandal in June 2019. This time stemming from an Instagram post by Cathy Guetta, the ex-wife of fellow DJ and collaborator - David Guetta, which lead to social media users alleging this was proof of further infidelity from the DJ. Following this, the couple did not immediately respond to the rumors; however, it was noticed that Enhle had removed all pictures of the couple together from her Instagram. Maphumulo later took to Twitter to deny the allegations whilst also commenting on the way on the "lynch-mob mentality" of the users involved in spreading the allegations.

The couple separated in July 2019, with divorce proceedings beginning later that year. The divorce proceedings continued into 2020 and with them came further scandals. This included the publication of a leaked set of documents allegedly showing some of the financial demands being made by Mlotshwa.

The now divorced couple made headlines once again in April 2021 when TrueLove, a division of South African media juggernaut Media24, reported that Enhle Mbali had filed for a protection order against her ex-husband alleging that he had assaulted her at her birthday dinner held at a home still shared by the couple. The allegations were made during a time of public outrage against the extremely high levels of Gender Based Violence (GBV) that were being experienced in South Africa. The report came following a statement from Mbali confirming that she was seeking a protection order and that, according to her, it was her "duty as a woman to not only fight for myself, but for every single woman in South Africa". She further went on to mention two widely known cases of alleged GBV, including that of Reeva Steenkamp, and that she wanted to help bring an end to these cases.

The DJ immediately responded to the allegation in a series of Tweets in which he denied the claims of assault whilst also recounting the GBV he witnessed within his own household whilst growing up. He further implied that this was an attempt by Mbali to separate him from his children and "their" home. He ended the Tweets with one which explained that he, "as a law-abiding citizen", would be observing the demands of the interim order but would fight against the permanent installation of the order.

On the 7th of May 2021, the DJ once again took to Twitter to share the news that the South African Court had ruled in his favour and set aside the interim protection order whilst also dismissing Mbali's case. In a since deleted video on Instagram, Mbali announced that she "would no longer protect" Maphumulo and would be speaking openly about the abuse she alleged to have suffered as well as further alleging that Maphumulo had also emotionally tormented their children. Mbali then announced that she would be a holding a press conference in which she would publicize evidence, text messages and "everything else that was lied about".

The press conference announced by Mbali would never materialize, but on the 12th of August 2021, the actor made an Instagram post teasing an upcoming production titled "Voice". This was released in the following September as a docu-series posted to her Instagram in which she recounted her life story. In an interview in February 2022, Mbali shared her reasoning for making and releasing the documentary, as well as expressing her disappointment in the South African Court system and that she believed it had failed her.

Discography 
Apart from singles and remixes, Maphumulo has released the following albums and DVDs since 2005, all under his Soulistic Music banner.
 Black Coffee (2005)
 Have Another One (2007)
 Home Brewed (2009)
 Africa Rising DVD (2012)
 Africa Rising CD (2012)
 Pieces of Me (2015)
 The Journey Continues EP (2016)
Music is King EP (2018)
Subconsciously (2021)

Awards and nominations

References

External links 

 Resident Advisor Website

1976 births
South African DJs
South African house musicians
Living people
Deep house musicians
Electronic dance music DJs
Zulu people
Ultra Records artists
Grammy Award winners for dance and electronic music